Tom Clements (born 1951) is an American environmental activist and politician from South Carolina. Clements was the Green Party's nominee in the 2010 United States Senate election in South Carolina. Clements received more than 9% of the general election. He is the Southeastern Nuclear Campaign Coordinator for the US branch of Friends of the Earth in Columbia, South Carolina. Clements worked as the campaign manager for Democratic Congressman Doug Barnard, Jr. in the 1980s and as well as a long environmental activist with Greenpeace and the Nuclear Control Institute.

Activism
Clements worked as a policy analyst in the United States Forest Service and as an inspector in the Office of Surface Mining for the U.S. Department of the Interior. Clements worked the executive director of the Nuclear Control Institute, a research and advocacy center for preventing nuclear proliferation and nuclear terrorism. He joined NCI in February 1999 and is responsible for the organization's day-to-day operations. Prior to joining NCI, Clements was a senior nuclear campaigner with Greenpeace. He is considered a nuclear and plutonium expert by the New York Times. He is also the Southeastern Nuclear Campaign Coordinator for the US branch of Friends of the Earth in Columbia, South Carolina. Friends of the Earth is the considered the public interest watchdog over the Department of Energy's Savannah River Site nuclear complex. In the 1970’s, Clements founded Athenians for Clean Energy in Athens, Georgia. ACE was an early environmental movement working to eliminate toxic waste disposal and coal burning by the University of Georgia. Their focus was to educate the Athens, Georgia community about emerging environmental issues.

2010 Senatorial campaign
 

Clements, who had no previous experience with the Green Party, was approached by party leadership in January 2010 and asked to run for the United States Senate later that year. He won the Green Party's nomination for Senate in May and by June had raised 15,000 dollars towards his Senate campaign. Though not included in the Rasmussen poll data released in that same month, he claimed that the 9% of those polled supporting "other" was for his campaign. He ran against incumbent Republican Jim DeMint and military veteran and Democrat Alvin Greene as well as several write-in candidates.

Clements raised more than $45,000 by mid-October,. Incumbent Jim DeMint reported more than $3 million raised to date. Democrat Alvin Greene reported no fundraising activities. Clements campaigned around the state from June through November 1, appearing at NAACP forums, stump meetings, editorial conferences and other public events. The campaign financed TV and radio advertisements to run in the Columbia, Charleston and Pee Dee regions during the two weeks prior to the election.

A Winthrop University poll conducted between October 5 and 10 with 741 likely South Carolina voters found Clements running second with 12.2% of the vote against 11.2% for Democrat Alvin Greene and 58.3% for incumbent Jim DeMint.

Political positions
Clements opposes the continuing practice of dumping nuclear waste in South Carolina. He opposes offshore drilling, with his website calling it "a potentially disastrous gamble that could destroy South Carolina’s coastline, along with her fishing and tourism industries". Clements supports the new START Treaty with Russia. His campaign also focused on conservation and job creation.

Senate candidacy endorsements
On July 6, 2010, the Greater Columbia Central Labor Council of the SC AFL-CIO gave Clements their endorsement. On September 9, The Nation'''s John Nichols suggested that Democrats embrace Clements as the most progressive choice and best option in the South Carolina Senate election over Greene and DeMint.

Clements for Senate was formally endorsed by the national Sierra Club, Friends of the Earth Action, and by the South Carolina Latino Political Action Committee.

In a first for a minor party candidate in South Carolina, Clements was endorsed for Senate by a daily paper, the Rock Hill Herald''.

Campaign result
Clements received 121,472 in the final tally, 9.22% of the total 1,318,794 votes cast. This is the best result for a candidate in South Carolina who was not a Democrat or Republican since Strom Thurmond won as a write-in candidate in 1954. Clements' result also exceeds the previous best result for a progressive statewide candidate; Ralph Nader received 20,297 votes for President from SC in 2000.

Personal and education
Clements was born in 1951 in Savannah, Georgia. He is an eighth generation Georgian. He served in the Peace Corps in Costa Rica and is fluent in Spanish. Clements has an MA degree in Forest Resources from the University of Georgia and a BA from Emory University.

See also
Anti-nuclear movement in the United States
Friends of the Earth
 United States Senate election in South Carolina, 2010

References

External links 
 Clements For Senate
 And in the Third Corner…  Columbia City Paper, October 6, 2010

1951 births
Living people
Candidates in the 2010 United States elections
21st-century American politicians
American anti–nuclear power activists
Politicians from Columbia, South Carolina
Politicians from Savannah, Georgia
South Carolina Greens
Emory University alumni
University of Georgia alumni
Peace Corps volunteers